The Basketball Bundesliga MVP (Most Valuable Player) is an award that is given yearly to the best player in the regular season of the Basketball Bundesliga, which is the top professional basketball league in Germany.

Winners

Prior to 1994, the award was given as the German Player of the Year award, and was given to the "Best German Player" of the season, regardless of what league he played in. So to win the award, a player didn't even have to play in the German League. From 1994 onward, the German Player of the Year award was changed to instead mark the Most Valuable Player of the Basketball Bundesliga (German Basketball League).

Awards won by player

Awards won by nationality

Awards won by club

References

External links
German League official website 

Basketball most valuable player awards
Most Valuable Player
European basketball awards